Hapana is a genus of moths of the family Thyrididae.

This genus is known from Madagascar, Mauritius, continental Africa, Aldabra and North India.
They are relatively small, with a winglength between 6 and 10.5 mm.

Type species: Hapana verticalis (Warren, 1899)

Species
Some species of this genus are:

Hapana carcealis 	Whalley, 1971
Hapana milloti 	(Viette, 1954)
Hapana minima 	Whalley, 1971
Hapana verticalis 	(Warren, 1899)

References

Thyrididae
Moth genera